Maccabi Haifa Weightlifting team is a branch of Maccabi sports association in Israel.  This team is located in Haifa, the major city in the North part of Israel and active from 1991.  Almost all of the team members including the coach immigrated to Israel during the great wave of immigration from Russian-speaking countries in the 1990s. 
This team was formed by Semyon Minaker, who was its first coach and trained this team until his retirement.

From 1992 to 1997, Maccabi Haifa weight lifting team constantly won National Competitions.  Some members of this team hold the National Champion titles.

Here is the list of Maccabi Haifa Weightlifting team former and current members:

 Alexander Feler
 Dimitry Apelbaum
 Michael Plax
 Rostislav Novak 
 Alexander Shifrin 
 Roman Peler 
 Vasily Shteinberg 
 Seva Solomynik 
 Jenia Hutorskoy

Weight
Weightlifting
Weightlifting in Israel